The 2004 Solihull Metropolitan Borough Council election took place on 10 June 2004 to elect members of Solihull Metropolitan Borough Council in the West Midlands, England. 
The whole council was up for election with boundary changes since the last election in 2003. The Conservative Party stayed in overall control of the council.

Campaign
During the lead up to the election the Labour Party suffered 2 defections. Firstly councillor Jim Ryan quit the party to sit as an independent after disagreements over policy. He was then followed in May 2004 by Jeff Potts who defected to join the Conservatives and blamed infighting within the Labour Party for his decision. Both councillors contested the election, Jim Ryan as an independent, and Jeff Potts as a Conservative in Kingshurst and Fordbridge ward.

The election saw the British National Party (BNP) contest 2 seats in Chelmsley Wood and Olton wards, while the National Front contested Silhill ward. The presence of these candidates led the leaders of each of the Conservative, Liberal Democrat and Labour parties on the council to condemn the policies of both the BNP and National Front.

Election result
The results saw the Conservatives stay in control of the council but with their majority cut from 5 to 3 seats. The Conservative dropped by 1 seat, while the Liberal Democrats became the next largest party on the council after gaining 5 seats. Labour dropped by 5 seats, 3 of which could be put down to the boundary changes, while another seat was lost by Labour to the Conservatives in Kingshurst and Fordbridge. The final Labour loss came in Bickenhill where former Labour councillor Jim Ryan was re-elected onto the council as an independent. Overall turnout increased by 10% from 2003 to reach 39%.

This result had the following consequences for the total number of seats on the council after the elections :

Ward results

By-elections between 2004 and 2006

References

2004 English local elections
2004
2000s in the West Midlands (county)